Poerua River may refer to one of two rivers on the West Coast of New Zealand's South Island:

 Poerua River (Grey District)
 Poerua River (Westland District)